Roy Wassberg (born 28 September 1970 in Bergen) is a Norwegian footballer, most known for his two runs in SK Brann.

Wassberg first played for Brann between 1989 and 1993, before he transferred to the "other team" from Bergen, Fyllingen. Later that season his dream of playing football in Europe came true when he left his home city to play ball in Greece. Wassberg spent four years in Greece, where he won the 1996-97 Beta Ethniki and the 1997-98 Greek Cup with Panionios NFC. Wassberg later returned to Bergen and Brann where he played for the next seven seasons, and captained in 2003.

In the middle of the 2004 season, Wassberg was released from Brann, and he decided to return to his motherclub, Fyllingen. In the 2006 pre-season, Wassberg was appointed the new head coach in Fyllingen, whilst still playing for the club. He managed Fyllingen's successor club FK Fyllingsdalen in 2020 and 2021.

Personal life
Wassberg is the son-in-law of the former football manager and player Roald Jensen, and the father of the current player Niklas Jensen Wassberg.

Honours
Panionios
 Greek Cup: 1997–98

References

1970 births
Living people
Norwegian footballers
SK Brann players
Fyllingen Fotball players
Panionios F.C. players
Ethnikos Piraeus F.C. players
Super League Greece players
Super League Greece 2 players
Eliteserien players
Norwegian First Division players
Norwegian expatriate footballers
Expatriate footballers in Greece
Norwegian expatriate sportspeople in Greece
Association football central defenders
Norway under-21 international footballers
Norwegian football managers
Footballers from Bergen